"Steal the Night" is a song by Stevie Woods. It was released in 1981 as the first single from his album Take Me to Your Heaven.

The song is Woods' first top 40 and top 20 hit on the Billboard Hot 100 and Adult Contemporary charts, peaking at No. 25 and No. 14 respectively.

Chart performance

References

1981 singles
1981 songs
Cotillion Records singles
Stevie Woods (musician) songs